Salpn is the common name for a chelating ligand, properly called N,N-bis(salicylidene)-1,2-propanediamine, used as a motor oil additive.

The molecular structure of pure (metal-free) salpn, sometimes denoted H2(salpn) or salpnH2, can be described as the salen ligand with a methyl group attached to the ethylene bridge that links the two nitrogen atoms. 

As in the case of salen compound, the actual ligand is usually the conjugate base salpn2-, the divalent anion that result from the metal-free compound by the loss of two hydroxyl protons. This dianion is commonly denoted "(salpn)" in formulas of metal complexes.

The abbreviation "salpn" is also sometimes used for the structural isomer N,N-bis(salicylidene)-1,3-diamino­propane and its conjugate base, derived from 1,3-diaminopropane rather than 1,2-diaminopropane.

Preparation
The synthesis of salpn is achieved by a condensation reaction of 1,2-diaminopropane with salicylaldehyde:
2C6H4(OH)CHO + CH3CH(NH2)CH2NH2 → [C6H4(OH)CH]2CH3CHNCH2N + 2H2O

Uses
Salpn is used as a fuel additive as a metal deactivator in motor oils. Trace metals degrade the fuels by catalyzing oxidation processes that lead to gums and solids. Metal deactivators like salpn form stable coordination compounds with the metals, suppressing their catalytic activity. While salpn forms stable chelate complexes with many metals including copper, iron, chromium, and nickel, it is the coordination with copper that makes it a popular choice as a fuel additive. Copper has the highest catalytic activity in fuel, and salpn forms a highly stable square planar complex with the metal.

Salpn is preferred over salen, possibly because it has higher solubility in non-polar liquids.

References

Schiff bases
Phenols
Tetradentate ligands